Super Blood Wolf Moon is the third album by the post-punk group Brix & the Extricated, released on 25 October 2019 on Grit Over Glamour records. The album was released on CD and digital formats.

Critical reception

The album received positive reviews, including from Louder Than War, who described it as "blissful classic guitar pop". The website We Are Cult said it was "clearly Brix and the Extricated’s best album, and their darkest, and their deepest...".

Track listing
All songs written by Brix & the Extricated / Brix Smith
"Strange Times"
"Hustler"
"Wolves"
"Waterman"
"Dinosaur Girl"
"Crash Landing"
"Wintertyde"
"Wasteland"
"Tannis Root"
"The God Stone"

Personnel
Brix & the Extricated
Brix Smith Start - vocals
Steve Hanley - bass guitar
Paul Hanley - drums
Steve Trafford - guitar, vocals
Jason Brown - guitar

References

2019 albums
Brix & the Extricated albums